Ekdin Pratidin  is a Drama Bengali television serial which aired on Zee Bangla.

Cast
Aparajita Ghosh Das as Mohor 
Rishi Kaushik as Indra
 Bulbuli Panja / Monami Ghosh as Barsha
Parambrata Chattopadhyay as Brata
Sayantani Ghosh / Sohini Sarkar as Koyel
Baishaki Marjit as Mohor's mother
Basudeb Mukherjee as Mohor's father
Sudipa Basu as Sudipa
Biswajit Chakraborty as Biswajit
Rita Dutta Chakraborty as Brata's mother
Debshankar Halder as Benu
Mithu Chakraborty as Indra's mother
Santu Mukherjee as Indra's father
Kanchan Mallick as Sushil
Anindya Banerjee as Bishu
Pushpita Mukherjee as Sohini
Arindam Sil as Rono
Subhrajit Dutta as Apu
Kushal Chakraborty as Somendra
Payel Sarkar as Diya
Sudipa Chatterjee as Ishita
Bharat Kaul as Aniruddha
Saswata Chatterjee as Abhimanyu
Moumita Gupta as Abhimanyu's mother 
Sanjeev Dasgupta as Shovon
Indrani Basu as Mallika
Swarnakamal Dutta as Pola 
Kaushik Chakrabarty as Dipto
Payel De as Chandryee
Arunima Ghosh as Poroma
Rimjhim Mitra as Gunja
Bobby Chakrabarty as Jojo
Dulal Lahiri as Gurudev

References

External links

2005 Indian television series debuts
Bengali-language television programming in India
2007 Indian television series endings
Zee Bangla original programming